White Hill is a peak in the Cape Breton Highlands and is the highest elevation point in the province of Nova Scotia, Canada.

Survey monument 
There is a first order Natural Resources Canada Geodetic Survey Division Station (Unique Number: 23105) on the summit, consisting of a marker, a brass/bronze disk, set in the top of a concrete pier on a small bedrock outcrop. There was a metal tower marking the site, but it was lying on the ground as of 2008. The station was surveyed and placed in June 1923 and the marker was renewed in 1963. The station was inspected by helicopter in 1976 and 1987.

See also
 List of highest points of Canadian provinces and territories

References

External links
 Atlas of Canada – Facts about mountains
 Peakbagger 1994 Summary of White Hill and surroundings (with photo)
 2007 Summary of hike to White Hill and surroundings (with many photos)
 2008 Summary of hike to White Hill and surroundings (with many photos)

Mountains of Nova Scotia
Landforms of Victoria County, Nova Scotia
Mountains of Canada under 1000 metres